The 2004–2008 volcanic activity of Mount St. Helens in Washington, United States has been documented as a continuous eruption in the form of gradual extrusion of magma. Starting in October 2004 and ceasing in January 2008, a new lava dome was built up. The new dome did not rise above the rim of the crater created by the 1980 eruption of Mount St. Helens.

2004 activity
On September 23, 2004, around 2:00 a.m. PDT, Mount St. Helens experienced an earthquake swarm, with about 200 small (less than magnitude 1) earthquakes occurring less than one-half mile (one kilometer) below the 1980s lava dome. Activity increased, and on September 26, the U.S. Geological Survey (USGS) and Pacific Northwest Seismograph Network issued a "notice of volcanic unrest", stating that a "hazardous event" was possible, and the U.S. Forest Service closed the mountain to all climbing. They also closed some trails in the area, due to the risk of debris flows from the possible melting of the Crater Glacier in the volcanic crater.

Seismic activity continued to accelerate following the USGS advisory, with earthquakes approaching magnitude 2.5 occurring at a rate of about four per minute on September 29, prompting the USGS and Pacific Northwest Seismograph Network to issue a second advisory, increasing the "alert level" to the second of three levels, and warn of an increased likelihood of a steam explosion or eruption from the lava dome within the next few days. Such an event was expected to be relatively small and not pose a threat to regions beyond the immediate area of the mountain. However, the intensities and occurrences of the earthquakes continued to rise. The largest earthquake recorded was a magnitude 3.3.

At 12:02p.m. PDT on October 1, 2004, the mountain erupted a plume of steam and volcanic ash about 9,700 feet (about 3 kilometers) into the air (according to pilot reports), from a vent in the then-unnamed Crater Glacier just southwest of the lava dome. The resulting ash plume was reported to have drifted south to Vancouver, Washington, Northern California and Wood Village, Oregon, dusting cars with a fine layer of black, sooty ash.

Mount St. Helens vented another plume of steam the next day at 12:14p.m. PDT, which was stronger than the previous steam release. A low-frequency harmonic tremor followed the steam release, which led seismologists to raise the "alert level" to the third of three levels, indicating a potential threat to life and property.

On October 3, low-frequency harmonic tremor activity began at around 3:00a.m. PDT and lasted for up to 90 minutes, which may have indicated the movement of magma beneath the mountain. The tremors were followed by a steam release at around 10:40a.m.

Between steam releases, elevated seismic activity on the mountain continued with the strongest tremors remaining near magnitude 3.0.

On October 6, the U.S. Geological Survey announced that the alert level was being lowered, saying "We no longer think that an eruption is imminent in the sense of minutes or hours."

Magma reached the surface of the volcano around October 11, resulting in the building of a new lava dome on the existing dome's south side. Dome building continued, with the USGS reporting in early November 2004 that magma was being extruded at a rate of 7 to 10 cubic meters per second. Had magma continued to extrude at this rate uninterrupted, the crater would have been completely filled and Mount St. Helens would have regained its former height in about eleven years. The Mount St. Helens VolcanoCam located at Johnston Ridge was able to view the new dome especially at night when the glow of new magma was visible via the camera's infrared capabilities.

Included in the new dome was a feature dubbed the "Whaleback" (named such because of its close resemblance to the back of a whale), which was a lava spine, a long shaft of solidified magma being extruded by pressure of magma underneath it. This feature was very hot but fragile. The edges of it began crumbling rapidly, forming loose material around the new dome. The rate of crumbling soon matched the rate of growth, with the size of the whaleback remaining fairly constant.

2005 activity
On February 1, 2005, the new lava dome on Mount Saint Helens measured  in elevation. The total amount of glacier lost by this date was estimated to be 5–10%, but the flow of water from the crater was almost unchanged because the porous nature of the floor of the crater caused the water to be absorbed quickly.

Mount St. Helens experienced major activity again on March 8, 2005, at about 5:30p.m. PST, when a  plume of steam and presumably ash was witnessed emerging from the volcano, accompanied by a tremor that measured about magnitude 2.5. The plume was visible from the metropolitan areas of Seattle, Washington, to Salem, Oregon, but only lasted for about 20–30 minutes. Ash was reported falling from the sky in Yakima, Washington, and surrounding areas. This activity was not considered a large eruption but merely a minor release of pressure consistent with the nature of dome building. Scientists believed it was triggered by a partial collapse of the lava dome. There was no increase in quake activity before the volcanic event.

Growth of the new dome continued steadily, and small earthquakes continued to be observed every few minutes. The whaleback feature disintegrated steadily but continued to be extruded as solidified lava pushed upward from below.

On July 2, 2005, the tip of the whaleback feature broke off, causing a rockfall that sent ash and dust several hundred meters into the air.

2006 activity 
Following the collapse of the dome and whaleback, a new feature, termed the "slab", began growing.

On July 21, 2006, the crater rim was reopened to hikers.

On December 19, 2006, an eruption sent a steam plume billowing over Washington.

2008 activity 

After a relatively quiet 2007, on January 16, 2008, USGS geologist John S. Pallister spotted steam seeping from the lava dome in Mount St. Helens' crater. At approximately the same time, the Pacific Northwest Seismograph Network recorded a magnitude 2.9 earthquake, followed by a small tremor that lasted for nearly ninety minutes, and a magnitude 2.7 earthquake. But by the end of January, the lava dome growth had stopped. On July 10, 2008, it was determined that the eruption that began in 2004 had ended, after 5 months of inactivity.

References

External links 
 Mount St. Helens National Volcanic Monument website from the U.S. Forest Service
 Mount St. Helens National Volcanic Monument's VolcanoCam
 Mount St. Helens photographs and current conditions from the United States Geological Survey website
 Time-lapse images of Mount St. Helens dome growth 2004-2008 - by USGS

Mount St. Helens 2004
Mount St. Helens
Mount St. Helens
Mount St. Helens
Mount St. Helens
Mount St. Helens
Mount St. Helens 2004
Mount St. Helens 2004
Cascade Volcanoes
Volcanism of Washington (state)
Mount St. Helens
St. Helens
Gifford Pinchot National Forest
Mount St. Helens
Mount St. Helens
Mount St. Helens
Mount St. Helens
Mount St. Helens
St. Helens
Volcanic eruptions in the United States